The Shorter House is located at the end of Andrews Road in Thompson Ridge, a hamlet in the Town of Crawford in Orange County, New York, United States. It is a late 18th-century building later modified in the Greek Revival style.

It was added to the National Register of Historic Places in 1998.

References

Houses on the National Register of Historic Places in New York (state)
Houses in Orange County, New York
National Register of Historic Places in Orange County, New York
Greek Revival houses in New York (state)